The 1951 Nebraska Cornhuskers football team was the representative of the University of Nebraska and member of the Big Seven Conference in the 1951 college football season. The team was coached by Bill Glassford and played their home games at Memorial Stadium in Lincoln, Nebraska.

Before the season
Coach Glassford's third year at the helm commenced with hopeful expectations after the turnaround season of 1950 that produced Nebraska's first winning record in ten years.  The Cornhuskers had finished out the previous season ranked #17 by the AP Poll, following a competitive 35-49 loss to the national champion Oklahoma Sooners, and it looked like the train was finally back on the tracks in Lincoln.  Returning for 1951 was the entire coaching staff of the previous season, and the AP shined favorably on Nebraska by introducing the Cornhuskers at #12 to open the 1951 slate.

Schedule

Roster

Coaching staff

Bob Tritsch – Student Manager 1948–1951, Senior Student Manager 1950–51

Game summaries

TCU

The 1951 Cornhuskers stumbled out of the gate, falling to Texas Christian in Lincoln in the first-ever meeting of these teams.  The combination of a new and innovative TCU offensive formation with ill-timed Nebraska turnovers gave the Horned Frogs a relatively easy win.  TCU went on the finish the season 6-4-0 and ranked #11 by the AP Poll.

Kansas State

A large contingent of Cornhusker fans traveled to Manhattan for the season's road-opening game, braving the wet weather and with hopes of another easy win over the beleaguered Kansas State team.  The Wildcats succeeded in slowing the Nebraska attack following the first touchdown of the day, and managed to tie the game after the half and hold on the finish the game at an even 6-6.  Nebraska returned to Lincoln without an outright win in the series for the first time in the last nine meetings, but the Wildcats were later penalized for using an ineligible player for the game and had to forfeit the resulting tie.  The official final recorded score for the game was later revised, to a 1-0 Nebraska victory, moving the Cornhuskers to 29-4-2 against Kansas State to date.

Penn State

After a lackluster opening to the season, Coach Glassford reorganized his personnel in preparation for the visit by Penn State.  The Nittany Lions scored first, but the Cornhuskers made it a battle by firing right back to go up 7-6.  Scoring was sparse on the day, but Nebraska was unable to answer a later touchdown by Penn State and fell to 1-3 in the series.

Minnesota

Minnesota hosted the Cornhuskers in Minneapolis and successfully avenged their rare loss to Nebraska by taking advantage of a series of Cornhusker miscues just prior to the halftime break.  Until the shift of momentum, it appeared that Nebraska might be able to make a fight out of the contest, but the Golden Gophers were once again triumphant, advancing their commanding lead in the series to 26-5-2.

Missouri

For the second week in a row, second-quarter mistakes proved costly to the Cornhuskers, as a 7-7 tie was broken open with two quick Missouri touchdowns before the half.  By falling to the Tigers, who had as yet not won a game themselves, the Cornhusker season now seemed to be spiraling out of control, bringing back visions of the painful 1940s.  Nebraska's lead in the series slipped to 25-16-3, and Missouri took back the Victory Bell for the year.

Kansas

Homecoming week brought the Kansas Jayhawks to Lincoln, but more Cornhusker turnovers spelled doom for hopes of the season's first outright victory.  Five of Nebraska's six fumbles were lost to Kansas, making little work for the Jayhawks to pick up the win and disappoint the homecoming crowd.  Nebraska remained ahead in the series 41-13-3, but remained winless on the field in all six games of the season so far

Iowa State

Coach Glassford again implemented changes, installing elements of the spread formation presented by the Texas Christian team in Nebraska's season-opening loss, and successfully managed to snatch the season's first victory against the Cyclones.  The turnover battle was also won by the Cornhuskers on the field, as Iowa State gave up six interceptions and failed to take away either of Nebraska's two fumbles on the day.  Thus an outright winning streak was kept alive as the Cornhuskers left Ames with six straight decisions over the Cyclones and improved to 36-8-1 in the series.

Colorado

Nebraska again attacked using the new spread formation, but found less success than the previous week, and once again the Cornhuskers were set back by miscues in the 2nd quarter.  With key injuries taking a toll, Nebraska reverted to the T formation against the Buffaloes but was unable to produce meaningful results and fell before the visiting Colorado squad for the second year in a row, slipping to 6-4 in the series to date.

Oklahoma

Reigning league champion Oklahoma arrived in Lincoln ranked at #12 by the AP Poll, and set to the task of closing Nebraska's home field season with another Cornhusker loss.  The Nebraska defense made a fight out of the event for much of the game before collapsing in the 4th quarter.  No offensive look managed to get past the Sooners as the Cornhuskers were shut out for the first time of the season, giving up another decision to Oklahoma, yet still holding on to the series lead at 16-12-3.  The nine straight losses against the Sooners again extended Nebraska's record losing streak to any single team.  Oklahoma finished the season as undefeated Big 7 champions, 8-2-0 overall, and ranked #10.

Miami

The Cornhuskers traveled to Miami for the first-ever meeting of these teams, and fan expectation was not high for success.  Surprisingly, the Cornhuskers came out swinging and were actually leading the game 7-6 by halftime, avoiding the "2nd quarter jinx" that had haunted the squad for much of the season.  The second half told a different story as Nebraska's scoring came to a halt and the Hurricanes tacked on two more touchdowns to close out a very disappointing Cornhusker campaign.

Rankings

After the season
The brief successful fire seen in Nebraska's 1950 8-2 season was just as quickly darkened when the 1951 campaign fell flat.  Although the season eventually would be recorded as a dismal 2-8-0 after being revised because of the Kansas State forfeit, this was of no meaningful improvement over the original 1-8-1 end-of-season tally, and was significantly worse than coach Glassford's initial 5-4 record in his first year.  One bright spot looking to the future was the return of future NFL draft picks Bobby Reynolds and Ed Hussman, both set to play for one more year.

The disappointing close to 1951 brought coach Glassford's career record down to 9-9-0 (.500) in the Big 7, and dropped his previously winning overall record to 12-15-1 (.446).  The Nebraska program endured another hit to its legacy by slipping to 328-163-32 (.658) all time and 129-46-11 (.723) in conference play.

Future NFL and other professional league players
Ed Husmann, 1953 9th-round pick of the Chicago Cardinals
 Jerry Minnick, 1954 9th-round pick of the Washington Redskins
Bobby Reynolds, 1953 7th-round pick of the Los Angeles Rams

References

Nebraska
Nebraska Cornhuskers football seasons
Nebraska Cornhuskers football